Wild Rose was an American country music band founded in 1988 by five women: Pamela Gadd (lead and background vocals, banjo), Kathy Mac (bass guitar, vocals), Pam Perry (lead and harmony vocals, guitar, mandolin), Nancy Given (drums, vocals), and Wanda Vick (guitar, mandolin, fiddle, Dobro, steel guitar). Between 1988 and 1991, they recorded three studio albums, including two on Liberty Records. In that same time span, they charted three singles on the Billboard Hot Country Singles & Tracks (now Hot Country Songs) charts. Since their disbanding in 1991, Wanda Vick has worked as a session musician.  Gadd has continued to write and perform in the music industry, and was featured as part of country music legend Porter Wagoner's band until his death in 2007.  Gadd and Wagoner recorded an album of duets together.

Biography
Wild Rose was founded in 1988 by Wanda Vick, who had previously been a session musician for country music artist Lynn Anderson, and later a member of Porter Wagoner's road band Right Combination. The group's co-founder, drummer Nancy Given, was also a former member of Right Combination. (Her then-husband was Brian Prout of Diamond Rio.) Prout was followed by vocalist/banjo player Pamela Gadd and vocalist/guitarist Pam Perry, both formerly members of the bluegrass band New Coon Creek Girls. Completing the band's lineup was bass guitarist Kathy Mac.

Initially, the five women performed under the name Miss Behavin'. However, they changed to the name Wild Rose shortly before signing to Jimmy Bowen's Universal. Under the production of James Stroud, Wild Rose's debut album (titled Breakin' New Ground) was released in 1988. The album produced one hit single in its title track, which peaked at number 15 on the Billboard country charts. Universal closed not long afterwards.

Wild Rose later made an appearance on a television special titled Night of 100 Stars in 1990. Later that year, Capitol Records re-issued the band's debut album, and released a second single from it. The re-issued album earned Grammy Award and Academy of Country Music nominations for the band. Wild Rose later issued another album for Liberty before disbanding in 1991.

Discography

Albums

Singles

Notes:
A "Where Did We Go Wrong" did not chart on Hot Country Songs, but peaked at No. 4 on Hot Country Radio Breakouts.

Music videos

References

All-female bands
Country music groups from Tennessee
Capitol Records artists
Musical groups established in 1988
Liberty Records artists
Musical groups disestablished in 1991